KTNS (1060 AM) is an American radio station broadcasting adult contemporary music. Licensed to Oakhurst, California, the station serves the Fresno area. The station is owned by Lazer Broadcasting Corporation and features programming from AP Radio and Jones Radio Network.

KTNS used to be a 1,000 watt daytime only station on 1090 kHz. In 2002, the owner purchased the license of a station on 1060 kHz in Chico, California, and turned it into the U.S. Federal Communications Commission. That cleared the way for KTNS to move there, operate with higher power, and stay on the air 24 hours a day.

References

External links

TNS